Piotrkowice may refer to the following places in Poland:

Piotrkowice, Lower Silesian Voivodeship (south-west Poland)
Piotrkowice, Kuyavian-Pomeranian Voivodeship (north-central Poland)
Piotrkowice, Lesser Poland Voivodeship (south Poland)
Piotrkowice, Jędrzejów County in Świętokrzyskie Voivodeship (south-central Poland)
Piotrkowice, Kazimierza County in Świętokrzyskie Voivodeship (south-central Poland)
Piotrkowice, Kielce County in Świętokrzyskie Voivodeship (south-central Poland)
Piotrkowice, Grodzisk Mazowiecki County in Masovian Voivodeship (east-central Poland)
Piotrkowice, Kozienice County in Masovian Voivodeship (east-central Poland)
Piotrkowice, Konin County in Greater Poland Voivodeship (west-central Poland)
Piotrkowice, Kościan County in Greater Poland Voivodeship (west-central Poland)
Piotrkowice, Wągrowiec County in Greater Poland Voivodeship (west-central Poland)